Senator Briggs may refer to:

Members of the United States Senate
Frank O. Briggs (1851–1913), U.S. Senator from New Jersey from 1907 to 1913
Frank P. Briggs (1894–1992), U.S. Senator from Missouri from 1945 to 1947; also served in the Missouri State Senate

United States state senate members
Ebenezer N. Briggs (1801–1873), Vermont State Senate
Eddie Briggs (born 1949), Mississippi State Senate
James Frankland Briggs (1827–1905), New Hampshire State Senate
John Q. Briggs (1848–1921), Minnesota State Senate
John Briggs (politician) (born 1930), California State Senate
Richard Briggs (born 1952), Tennessee State Senate